Pyrausta signatalis, the raspberry pyrausta moth, is a moth in the family Crambidae. It was described by Francis Walker in 1866. It is found in North America, where it has been recorded from British Columbia to Ontario, south to North Carolina, South Carolina, Texas and Arizona. The habitat consists of aspen parkland and grasslands.

The wingspan is 18–22 mm. The forewings are bright pink or purplish with white antemedial and postmedial lines, as well as a white discal spot. The hindwings are light brown.

The larvae feed on Monarda species, including Monarda fistulosa.

References

Moths described in 1866
signatalis
Moths of North America